David Martin Abrahams (born 13 November 1944) is an English entrepreneur, philanthropist and political activist.

Early life
Abrahams was born in Newcastle upon Tyne, and brought up in Whitley Bay as the only child in a strongly political family. His father Bennie Abrahams (1906–1990) was a Labour councillor for the Monkchester ward of Newcastle City Councilfor 35 years, and served as the city's Lord Mayor for one year in 1981-2.

His mother Marion Marcelline Abrahams was a concert hall violinist for the Liverpool Philharmonic Orchestra and a Labour councillor in Newcastle. Abrahams was educated at Ascham House preparatory school, now Newcastle School for Boys in Gosforth, and passed his 11+ to Rutherford Grammar School.  In 1977, Mohammed Ali paid a visit to the Abrahams family home in Gosforth, where his 105-year-old Grandmother Annie Abrahams chatted to him about the underprivileged.  In July 1979, he accompanied his Grandmother aged 107 to meet the Queen at Buckingham Palace.

Political career

Abrahams was a councillor for the Labour Party on Tyne and Wear County Council for two and a half years from 1978 to 1981 when he lost to the Liberal candidate David Howarth who took 60% of the vote in a two way contest. His special interest was economic development.
He was selected in 1990 as the Labour candidate for Richmond, Yorkshire in the 1992 general election.  In 1997 he was unsuccessful in his attempt at selection for the safe Labour seat of Wansbeck near Newcastle.

A close associate of Tony Blair and Lord Levy during the New Labour-era, Abrahams faced high-profile media accusations in 2007 that he had secretly made £630,000 in donations to the Labour Party, by channelling the donations through four different individuals in what was thought to have been a breach of the electoral law on transparent disclosure. The Donorgate scandal put pressure on then Prime Minister Gordon Brown who set up an internal enquiry, although no report has ever been published. Abrahams was subsequently cleared of any wrongdoing by the police, in April 2008.

In April 2016, following remarks made by a Labour MP Naz Shah and the former Mayor of London, Ken Livingstone, Abrahams said that he would no longer financially support the Labour party, alleging that it was becoming increasingly anti-semitic. In an article for The Guardian he accused the hard left of perverting the principles of social justice and liberal, progressive politics.

Following the election of Keir Starmer as Leader of the Labour Party, Abrahams resumed making regular donations. In December 2020, Muslim groups, including the Muslim Council of Britain, called on Starmer to take action against Abrahams as a result of online comments he'd made, which were described as "abhorrent and Islamophobic" and "deeply disturbing". Among his comments was the claim that Muslims have "mixed loyalties"; he also stated "Don’t think I know how to divide political Islam from moderates and fundamentalists. It is the very nature of the beast!" and, commenting on Israel, he claimed that it was a "brand new hi-tech state with new inventions to benefit mankind" while its "close neighbours chose terrorism and invented suicide bombers". Mish Rahman, a member of the National Executive Committee of the Labour Party, called on Starmer to return Abrahams donations.

Other Interests

Abrahams is a Freeman of the City of London and a member of the Reform Club in Pall Mall.

Abrahams has been an active supporter of peace initiatives in the Middle East. His diplomatic efforts in many Middle East countries brought him into contact with Yasser Arafat as well as Hamas and other leaders establishing grounds for ongoing dialogue.

In 2010 it was reported that Abrahams had met senior Hamas officials including Palestinian Legislative Council speaker Aziz Dwaik and had appeared to wrest a significant change in tone from the Palestinian leadership. He indicated that Hamas officials were prepared to accept – but not necessarily recognise – the existence of Israel, and they would be prepared to nullify the part of the Hamas charter that calls for the obliteration of Israel.

He became Vice President of Royal United Services Institute (RUSI), in Whitehall in 2008, and subsequently its first global ambassador. His first mission was to organise a conference of Arab foreign ministers to discuss normalisation of relations with Israel and the establishment of a Palestinian state. During his term of office, he focused on promoting peace within the MENA region paying personal visits to most of the countries to discuss security and defence issues as well as geopolitical alliances whilst attending many conferences at the UN and throughout the area. Whilst at RUSI he initiated the All Party Parliamentary Group on Defence and Diplomacy and is one of their global ambassadors. In August 2013, Royal United Services Institute named David Petraeus as new senior vice president.

In 2013 it was reported that he had donated two tranches of £250,000 to found a chair in International Politics of the Middle East at Warwick University from 2005.

He has also served as Vice-Chairman of the Jewish Labour Movement, Acting Director of Labour Friends of Israel and on the Executive of the Trade Union Friends of Israel.

Since 1968, he has been involved North East Prisons After Care Society (NEPACS).  He is currently a trustee and Board Member.
He is a former founder and Vice Chair of North East Alzheimer’s Society and was for many years National Director of The Campaign For Pensioner Poverty. He served for twelve years as a trustee and on the executive of The Council for Christians and Jews, becoming their Director of Parliamentary Affairs.

Business
Abrahams founded the nationwide “London Girl” group of fashion shops and a chain of hotels in the north east. He has developed more than a hundred new homes in the former pit village of Haswell.  In an interview with the Guardian he spoke of the need to create jobs for people in “pit villages where there's a lot of deprivation, drugs and crime. People with nothing to do”.

In 2009, Abrahams obtained planning permission to build a 540-acre business park to create jobs on a site which he owned, near Bowburn, outside Durham, with onsite connectivity to the main Edinburgh-London railway line and off Junction 61 on the A1(M). He said he would donate the profits from building the business park to “causes he has supported in the past”.

In 2010, Abrahams was reported to be in talks with 15 potential tenants for a 540-acre site on the edge of Durham. He was subsequently reported to be selling the site.

In 2018, it was reported that the Integra 61 project on the site would include industrial units, offices, a hotel, shops, gym, care home, pub and GP surgery. Persimmon Homes obtained permission to build up to 270 houses on the site.

In 2019, it was reported that Amazon had bought part of the site and were building a warehouse of almost 2 million square which would create 4,000 new jobs. It is set to open in September 2020.

References

1944 births
Living people
British businesspeople
Labour Party (UK) parliamentary candidates
Businesspeople from Newcastle upon Tyne
Labour Friends of Israel
Jewish British politicians